Dasychira pinicola, the pine tussock moth, is a moth of the family Erebidae. The species was first described by Harrison Gray Dyar Jr. in 1911. It is found in the US states of New Jersey, Massachusetts,  Wisconsin and Minnesota.

The larvae feed on Pinus species, including Pinus banksiana.

References

Lymantriinae
Moths of North America
Moths described in 1911